As of June 2019, Nouvelair operates scheduled services to the following destinations:

References

Nouvelair